Leó Goldberger, full name Dr. Leó Buday-Goldberger (Budapest, 2 May 1878 - Mauthausen, 5 May 1945) was a major Hungarian textile industrialist and art collector who was arrested and starved to death by the Nazis at the Mauthausen concentration camp because of his Jewish heritage. 

Chairman and managing director of the Goldberger factory, founded in 1785, director of the National Association of Industrialists (GYOSZ), president of the National Association of Hungarian Textile Manufacturers, member of the board of the Hungarian Institute of Foreign Trade, senior adviser to the Hungarian National Bank, and from 1935 member of the Hungarian House of Lords, Goldberger played a major role in its modernization in the first decades of the 20th century. On 19 March 1944, the day of the German invasion of Hungary[1], he was captured by the Gestapo and taken to a concentration camp, where he died a few days after the liberation of the Mauthausen camp.

History of the Goldberger family 
The ancestor of the Goldberger family, Perec, was a goldsmith who, according to family tradition, migrated to Hungary from Padua or Venice in Italy, or, according to other assumptions, from Moravia, and settled in Óbuda. His son Ferenc Goldberg, who changed his name to Goldberger in the early 19th century, was born here in 1755. In his youth he traded in textiles, and in 1785, in partnership with a bluemaker, the Czech master Stibrall, he founded a bluemaking factory in what is now Lajos Street, in the building where the Textile Museum in Budapest is located today. Thus began the history of the Goldberger Textile Factory.  Their products soon became very popular. In Budapest, it maintained a warehouse and a shop, the latter being the first to introduce gas lighting (using gas stored in a hose to power the burners), after the National Theatre and the Pilvax Café. Later he bought two houses next to the family home and workshop and expanded the factory on the land behind them.

Ferenc Goldberger was succeeded in the business by his son Samuel Goldberger (1784-1848). He had been involved in the manufacture of goods practically since 1810, while his father was involved in the sale of products. In 1845 he bought a perrotine machine, the most modern textile printing machine of the time.

The Goldbergers supported the 1848-49 Revolution and War of Independence: they were involved in supplying uniforms to the army. As a result, they had to pay a large war levy after the defeat of the War of Independence and had to surrender a large part of their products.

After Samuel Goldberger's death, his wife Elisabeth Adler took over the management of the factory, which quickly recovered and in 1854 was again granted the right to wholesale. The widow retired in 1861 (she died in 1869) and handed the business over to her sons. In 1857, Franz Joseph, who visited Pest-Buda, also visited the factory as a sign of his 'forgiveness' for the company's behaviour during the War of Independence. In 1867, the family received the title of nobility and took the first name Buday.

Károly Goldberger took over the company in 1870. His eldest son, Berthold Goldberger, took over in 1876 and headed the company until his death in 1913. During this period, the company switched from the then obsolete perrotine presses to cylinder presses and achieved considerable market success both at home and abroad. und F. Rt. (The abbreviation "Sám." and "F." referred to the great predecessors Samuel and Ferenc.)

Leó Goldberger's career 
Leó Goldberger was born on 2 May 1878, the second son of Berthold Goldberger. He studied law in Budapest and Vienna and became involved in the management of the firm. He was managing director, chief executive officer and, after his father's death, vice president and chief executive officer. In 1920 he became chairman and CEO of the company.

The company was a supplier to the army during the First World War. Due to the problems of raw material supply, Leo Goldberger had already considered setting up his own spinning and weaving mill alongside the fabric making and printing factory, but this was not possible until the end of the war in 1923. At that time, the weaving mill was built in Kelenföld, partly with the help of foreign investors, and in 1927 the spinning mill was added (this factory later operated under the name Kelenföldi Textilgyár - KELTEX).

In 1922, the company bought the office building in the centre of Budapest, in what is now Arany János Street, where it had rented until then, and set up its headquarters and a large part of its warehouse.[3] (The building still stands today, with the inscription "Goldberger" still visible. It currently houses a department of the Central European University.)

Leó Goldberger introduced a number of innovations. He immediately recognised the importance of copper oxide rayon,[5] which had appeared at the beginning of the century and could be used to make soft, shiny fabrics similar to natural silk. In 1919 he began using it to make his 'Parisette' brand (fabrics for dresses, blouses and underwear), for which he acquired the exclusive finishing rights from the German firm Bemberg. In the 1930s, he introduced film printing and the use of synthetic indigo dyes. They weathered the world economic crisis of the 1930s relatively well. From 1934 onwards, the company set up several subsidiaries abroad (in England, Belgium, Italy, France, the USA, Canada, Australia and elsewhere, even in Asian and African countries) to market its products, and also incorporated several smaller domestic trading companies. In 1938-1939, they reached their peak: they won prizes and awards at several world exhibitions, and their "Parisette" fabrics were a huge success.

Philanthropist and art collector 
Goldberger was the owner of a 17th painting of Saint Andrew thought to be the work of Jusepe de Ribera. Currently at the Museum of Fine Arts in Boston, it is not known how the painting travelled from Goldberger's collection to the United States. Goldberger was in contact with writers, scientists, actors, various professional and social associations and charitable institutions, on whose boards he served. In 1937, with Goldberger's financial support, the Department of Textile Chemistry of the Royal Hungarian Technical and Economic University was established. He was also a member of the upper house.

Persecution and murder under the Nazis 
As a Jewish businessman, Goldberger came under attack due to antisemitic racial laws. After the Second Jewish Law (1939), Goldberger received special permission from the Minister of Industry to retain his position as company CEO. When Nazi Germany occupied the country, Goldberger was arrested by the Gestapo on the first day, 19 March 1944. He was deported to the Mauthausen concentration camp and died of starvation on 5 May 1945.

Postwar Goldberger factory after Leó Goldberger 

In April 1944, the authorities ordered the dismantling of large factories and the transport of their equipment to the West, and this also applied to the Goldberger factory. However, the company did not implement this order and continued production, albeit at a greatly reduced rate. They suffered considerable damage due to bombing and the loss of export markets, but production was restarted after the war with great difficulty.

Mihály Burg became chairman of the board of directors, and in 1945 Antal Goldberger, who had returned from a concentration camp, took over as CEO. The company was nationalised on 26 March 1948 as Goldberger Textilművek und Kereskedelmi Rt. During the reorganisations of 1949-1950, it was divided into two parts: the Kelenföld factory was transformed into the Kelenföld Textile Combine National Enterprise and the Óbuda factory into the Goldberger Textile Printing and Finishing National Enterprise. In 1963, the textile industry underwent another major reorganisation, with the creation of the BUDAPRINT Cotton Printing Company[8] ("Panyova") from a number of cotton companies, with the former Goldberger factory remaining as its headquarters. In 1989, however, BUDAPRINT went bankrupt, and liquidation proceedings were initiated against it and against BUDAPRINT Goldberger Textilművek Rt. The more than 200-year-old company was thus dissolved.

See also 
History of Hungary

The Holocaust in Hungary

Hungary in World War II

Links 

 Bemberg Cupro
 Textilnyomás (benne a perrotine-nyomás is)
 A magyar gyapot 1934-ben (A magyar gyapottermesztés történetéből és benne Goldberger Leó szerepéről)[halott link]
 A Goldberger család szabadkőművessége[halott link]

References 

Hungarian businesspeople
Hungarian Jews who died in the Holocaust
Hungarian art collectors
1878 births
1945 deaths
People who died in Nazi concentration camps
Mauthausen concentration camp
Jewish art collectors